Nyctanthes is a genus of flowering plants in the family Oleaceae, native to southeastern Asia. It is currently accepted as containing two species; other species previously included in this genus have been transferred to other genera, most of them to Jasminum.

They are shrubs or small trees growing to 10 m tall, with flaky bark. The leaves are opposite, simple. The flowers are produced in small clusters of two to seven together. The fruit is a two-parted capsule, with a single seed in each part. The name Nyctanthes means "night flowering".

Species
 Nyctanthes aculeata Craib – Thailand 
 Nyctanthes arbor-tristis L. - (Night-flowering jasmine or "sad tree") native to India, Nepal, Bhutan, Assam, Arunachal Pradesh, Java, Sri Lanka and Sumatra.

References

Myxopyreae
Oleaceae genera